The Julian Youth Academy (JYA) was a fully accredited, private Christian boarding school located in Shasta County, California. JYA was a program of Teen Rescue, Inc., a nationwide support service that has worked with over 15,000 families since 1989. An all-girls boarding school, JYA helped teen girls in need of regular supervision. JYA provided an individualized education program, coaching, intervention, parent-training support groups, a high staff-to-student ratio, and aftercare support.

News 
The campus burned in 2003. The owners tried to rebuild, but faced legal battles with San Diego County.

As regards an October 2007 hearing conducted by the United States Government Accountability Office, the school was mentioned among the statement presented before the hearing panel.

In 2011 a mummified baby was found on the campus in Shasta County. It belonged to a staff member, who told the police that she hadn't fed the baby when it was born.

Julian Youth Academy now operates under River View Christian Academy.

References 

Defunct schools in California
Therapeutic boarding schools in the United States